Eunice Huthart (born 2 November 1966) is best known for winning Gladiators and then being invited to return to the show as a Gladiator herself, under the name "Blaze". She remains the only UK contender to ever become a Gladiator. She went on to become a stunt double for such stars as Famke Janssen, Angelina Jolie, Milla Jovovich, and Uma Thurman.

Gladiators 

Huthart made her first appearance on Gladiators in 1994, and went on to become the female series champion that year. In the Grand Final, she and Kerryn Sampey had an exciting Eliminator where Huthart fell down the Travelator twice and Sampey was able to pass her, but she fell down it too. Huthart was able to reach to top of the Travelator and swing to victory.

Following her triumph in the domestic series, Huthart advanced forward to the international series. While running the Gauntlet in the international series final, Huthart got into a spot of bother with American Gladiator, Ice, who was the first Gladiator she had to get past. As Huthart ran towards her, Ice raised her Ramrod and struck Huthart in the face. Huthart got to the end in just over 20 seconds which earned her five points. However, Huthart lost her cool and went back after Ice which earned her a telling off from referee, John Anderson. Huthart went on to win the international series.

After doing International Gladiators, Huthart was invited back to the show to become a Gladiator for the 1995 Sheffield Live Shows, and was given the name "Blaze". Huthart's time as a Gladiator was brief, however, as she wanted to represent her country in the Ashes series in Australia where she lost to her opponent from the domestic series final, Kerryn Sampey in the final. However, Huthart returned to win the 1995 Battle of the Champions, beating Australia's Bernie Withers in an exciting Eliminator which was almost a repeat of the domestic series final against Kerryn Sampey; Huthart fell down the Travelator the first time she ran up it, allowing Bernie to pass her, but she slipped down it as well, and Huthart was able to reach the top and earn the victory. Afterwards, Huthart decided to retire from competing in Gladiators, realising she was at the top of her game, and the time was right for her to bow out.

She did however return to the show in a coaching capacity for Series 5 of Gladiators. The series was billed as "The Challenge" with contenders from the North facing contenders from the South. Huthart's role was as Northern team coach and her duties were to advise and support her contenders throughout the series. However, in the grand final, both her male and female contenders lost to their southern counterparts, coached by Male Series 2 champion Phil Norman.

After Gladiators
Following International Gladiators, Huthart worked on the James Bond film GoldenEye, where she acted as a stunt double for Famke Janssen. She has since carved out a successful career doing stunts in such films as The Fifth Element, Titanic, The Avengers, The Wolfman and the Tomb Raider series. She frequently doubles for Angelina Jolie (and is godmother to her daughter Shiloh Jolie-Pitt), most recently in Salt. She has also been a stunt co-ordinator for the film V for Vendetta and more recently for the 2010 film Alice in Wonderland, and Pan. She is credited as stunt coordinator on episodes of BBC's Paradox and on the Star Wars film The Rise of Skywalker.

In 2013, Huthart became embroiled in the NewsCorp phone hacking scandal when she alleged that The Sun and News of the World newspapers hacked her voicemails while she was working as Angelina Jolie's stunt double on the film Mr. & Mrs. Smith in 2005.

References

External links

Living people
1966 births
English film actresses
Television presenters from Liverpool
British stunt performers
Gladiators (1992 British TV series)